HMS Cumberland was one of 10  armoured cruisers built for the Royal Navy in the first decade of the 20th century. She was assigned to the 2nd Cruiser Squadron of the Channel Fleet upon completion in 1903. After a refit in 1907–1908 she became a training ship in the Home Fleet. She was sent to West Africa after the beginning of World War I in August 1914 and captured 10 German merchant ships in September. Cumberland spent the rest of the war on convoy escort duties and patrolling for German commerce raiders. She was sold for scrap in 1921 and broken up two years later.

Design and description
The ships were designed to displace . They were powered by two 4-cylinder triple-expansion steam engines, each driving one shaft using steam provided by 31 Belleville boilers.

The Monmouth-class ships' main armament consisted of fourteen breech-loading (BL)  Mk VII guns. Four of these guns were mounted in two twin-gun turrets, one each fore and aft of the superstructure, and the others were positioned in casemates amidships. Six of these were mounted on the main deck and were only usable in calm weather. Ten quick-firing (QF) 12-pounder 12-cwt guns were fitted for defence against torpedo boats. Cumberland also carried three 3-pounder  Hotchkiss guns and two submerged 18-inch (450 mm) torpedo tubes.

Beginning in 1915, the main deck six-inch guns of the Monmouth-class ships were moved to the upper deck and given gun shields. Their casemates were plated over to improve seakeeping. The twelve-pounder guns displaced by the transfer were repositioned elsewhere. At some point in the war, a pair of three-pounder anti-aircraft guns were installed on the upper deck. 
 
The armour of the gun turrets, their barbettes and the casemates was four inches thick.

Construction and service
Cumberland, named for the English county, was laid down by London and Glasgow Shipbuilding at their shipyard in Govan on 19 February 1901 and launched on 16 December 1902, when she was named by Lady Morpeth. She was completed on 1 December 1904 and assigned to the 2nd Cruiser Squadron of the Channel Fleet. She was transferred to the Home Fleet in December 1906 and was refitted to serve as a cadet training ship from 1907–08. From May 1912 to July 1914 she was under the command of Captain Aubrey Smith and was present for the July 1914 Fleet review at Spithead.

She was sent to West Africa after the beginning of the war in August and supported operations in the Cameroons where she captured 10 German merchantmen at Douala on 27 September. She was assigned to the 5th Cruiser Squadron in January 1915 where she conducted patrols for German raiders and escorted convoys for the rest of the war.

Cumberland was paid off in April 1920 in Queenstown, Ireland and sold to Thos. W. Ward for scrap on 9 May 1921. She was finally broken up at Briton Ferry in 1923.

Notes

Footnotes

Bibliography 
 
 
 
 
 
 

 
 

Monmouth-class cruisers
Ships built on the River Clyde
1902 ships
World War I cruisers of the United Kingdom